Pallasgreen GAA club is a Gaelic Athletic Association club in Pallasgreen/Templebraden parish in east County Limerick, Ireland. The club was founded in 1887 and is a dual club fielding teams in both hurling and Gaelic football.

Location
The club is situated in the parish of Pallasgreen/Templebraden and is a member of the East Board of Limerick GAA. The club is centred on the villages of Pallasgreen, Old Pallas, Nicker and Barna. The parish is roughly 22 km southeast of Limerick City and just 8 km from the border with County Tipperary. Neighbouring clubs are Kilteely/Dromkeen, Caherline, Caherconlish, Cappamore, Doon, Oola and Knockane. Knockane is the other GAA club situated in the southern half of the parish around the townlands of Knockane, Garrydoolis, Templebraden, Ballyneety and Sarsfield's Rock. Knockane fields Junior B hurling and football teams and has no underage structure. All juveniles therefore play with Pallasgreen and anyone living in the Knockane area can still play with Pallasgreen under the parish rule.

History
The club was founded in 1887 in an area where Gaelic games were very strong well before the foundation of the GAA in 1884. A Pallasgreen team beat Abbeyfeale in a tournament final at Corcanree. They competed in tournaments at various locations in County Limerick and many from the parish played with Knockane which had already been founded in 1884. The club was formed as 'New Pallas Milesians' and its founding chairman was William Kennedy. During those early years Pallas, Knockane and Oola were all quite strong and players often interchanged between clubs. In 1898 Pallas contested their only County Senior Football Championship where they were easily defeated by the Commercials. Glory however did come in 1911 when they beat South Liberties in the County Intermediate Football Championship final. The club almost solely played football up to 1914 when a junior hurling team was formed. That team tasted success the following year when they won the County Junior Hurling Championship beating Granagh in the final.

Achievements
 Limerick Intermediate Hurling Championship (3) 1995, 2002, 2014
 Limerick Junior Hurling Championship (4) 1915, 1958, 1968, 1988
 Limerick Intermediate Football Championship (2) 2005, 2012

References

External sources

 "One Hundred Years of Glory: A History of Limerick GAA", O Ceallaigh, Séamus & Murphy, Seán, 1984. 
 "Face the Ball, Pallas!: A History of GAA Affairs in the Parish of Pallasgreen 1884-2002", O'Connell, Ger, 2003.

Gaelic games clubs in County Limerick
Hurling clubs in County Limerick
Gaelic football clubs in County Limerick